James Gladstone Edwards  (24 February 1927 – 5 April 2010) was a member of parliament for Napier, in the North Island of New Zealand.

Biography

Early life and career
Edwards was born in Sydney in 1927. His family moved to New Zealand when he was a child and settled in Napier. He attended Napier Boys' High School before going to Victoria University where he graduated with a Master of Arts. He then attended Wellington Teachers' College from 1945 to 1946 before becoming a teacher from 1947 to 1952. He then left teaching to take up a position as a lands and deeds clerk at the Department of Justice from 1953 to 1954.

Political career

Edwards joined the Labour Party in 1949 and became secretary of the Woodville branch of the party and from 1951 to 1952 he was a member of the  Labour Representation Committee. He then moved to Napier and was elected vice-president of the Napier branch in 1953 and also a member of the  Labour Representation Committee.

From 1956 to 1957 he was a member of the Labour Party's national executive. Edwards earned a reputation as a hardworking politician who had particularly strong inclinations to improving educational facilities. He was a staunch supporter of Arnold Nordmeyer (his father-in-law) as leader and attempted to manage the backbench MPs on Nordmeyer's behalf. His attempts backfired when his interactions became too heavy handed which grew the anti-Nordmeyer sentiment in the caucus. Alongside Bill Rowling, he was the only younger member of the caucus who supported Nordmeyer when he was challenged, successfully, for the leadership by Norman Kirk in 1965.

Due to his overzealous support for the now ex-leader Edwards soon found his relationships in caucus strained. In June 1966 he announced he would not stand for re-election for both personal reasons and as a matter of principle. Edwards was concerned with the increasing union domination of the party. He was expelled from the Labour Party the following year for having publicly claimed that militant unionists were putting pressure on representation committees. According to Edwards he was expelled without trial and had not been invited to meet with executive before he received a letter informing him that his membership had been terminated.

Later life and death
After exiting parliament he became public relations manager for Unilever New Zealand. He then became a management consultant based in Miramar, Wellington. He rejoined the Labour Party and in 1977 he unsuccessfully stood for the Wellington City Council on a Labour Party ticket. Ahead of the  he was an aspirant for the Labour nomination in the  electorate (which Nordmeyer had previously been the MP for) after the then MP, Gerald O'Brien, faced questions around his re-selection viability.

He was awarded the New Zealand 1990 Commemoration Medal, and the Queen's Service Medal for public services in the 1994 Queen's Birthday Honours.

A former resident of Island Bay, Wellington and Raumati, he then moved to Mandurah, Western Australia. He died at his Mandurah home in 2010 after a period of illness.

Personal life
In 1956 Edwards married Alison Nordmeyer, the daughter of senior Labour MP Arnold Nordmeyer, with whom he had one son and one daughter.

Notes

References

Further reading
Parliament and Conscience: 1950–1972 by S.P. Cottrell (1974, MA Thesis-University of Canterbury, Christchurch)
The Expulsion of John A. Lee and its Effects on the Development of the NZ Labour Party by B.S. Taylor (1970, MA Thesis-University of Canterbury, Christchurch)

1927 births
2010 deaths
Australian emigrants to New Zealand
People educated at Napier Boys' High School
Victoria University of Wellington alumni
New Zealand Labour Party MPs
Independent MPs of New Zealand
New Zealand educators
New Zealand businesspeople
Management consultants
People from Napier, New Zealand
New Zealand MPs for North Island electorates
Members of the New Zealand House of Representatives
Recipients of the Queen's Service Medal
New Zealand justices of the peace